Joseph Wales Clift (September 30, 1837 – May 2, 1908) was a U.S. Representative from Georgia.

Born in North Marshfield, Massachusetts, Clift attended the common schools and Phillips Academy, Andover, Massachusetts.
He was graduated from the medical school of Harvard University in 1862.
He entered the Union Army and was acting surgeon from July 13, 1862, to August 7, 1865.
He served in the Army of the Potomac until November 18, 1866.
Practiced medicine in Savannah, Georgia.
He was appointed registrar of the city of Savannah by Major General Pope under the reconstruction acts.
Upon the readmission of Georgia to representation was elected as a Republican to the 40th United States Congress and served from July 25, 1868, to March 3, 1869.
Presented credentials as a Member-elect to the 41st United States Congress, but was not permitted to qualify.
He died in Rock City Falls, New York, May 2, 1908.
He was interred in the cemetery adjoining the Clift estate, North Marshfield, Massachusetts.

References

1837 births
1908 deaths
Harvard Medical School alumni
Phillips Academy alumni
Republican Party members of the United States House of Representatives from Georgia (U.S. state)
19th-century American politicians
Politicians from Savannah, Georgia
Union Army surgeons